The 1996 Conference USA men's soccer tournament was the second edition of the Conference USA Men's Soccer Tournament. The tournament decided the Conference USA champion and guaranteed representative into the 1996 NCAA Division I Men's Soccer Championship. The tournament was hosted by the University of South Florida and the final games were played at USF Soccer Stadium.

Bracket

Awards
Most Valuable Midfielder:
Mike Mekelburg, USF
Most Valuable Forward:
Jeff Cunningham, USF
Most Valuable Defender:
Scott Ziemba, Marquette
Most Valuable Goalkeeper:
Jim Welch, Marquette

References

External links
 

Conference USA Men's Soccer Tournament
Tournament
Conference USA Men's Soccer Tournament
Conference USA Men's Soccer Tournament